Now That's What I Call Christmas! 4 is a 2010 double album from the Now That's What I Call Music! series in the United States. It was released on October 12, 2010, and peaked at No. 28 on the Billboard 200. The album has sold 440,000 copies as of January 2013.

Track list

Disc one

Disc two

Special Caroling Edition 
On September 27, 2011, Now That's What I Call Christmas! 4: Special Caroling Edition was released, with this version coming with printed lyrics to the songs.

Charts

Weekly charts

Year-end charts

References

External links 
 Official U.S. Now That's What I Call Music website

Now That's What I Call Music! Christmas albums
2010 compilation albums
2010 Christmas albums
Christmas 04
Pop Christmas albums